The 2020 Kyalami 9 Hours was an endurance event that took place on 12 December 2020 at the Kyalami Grand Prix Circuit in Midrand, South Africa. The event was the fourth and final race of the 2020 Intercontinental GT Challenge, a season curtailed by the COVID-19 pandemic.

Honda team JAS Motorsport won pole position for the event and dominated the race by leading for eight hours until heavy rain shuffled the order with an hour remaining. The race finished under a Full Course Yellow period and was won by BMW team Walkenhorst Motorsport, driven by local driver Sheldon van der Linde alongside Augusto Farfus, Jr. and Nick Catsburg. The result handed the latter two the drivers' title by five points over the third-placed trio of Matthew Campbell, Mathieu Jaminet and Patrick Pilet, while Porsche won the manufacturers' championship by 24 points over BMW.

Results

Qualifying

Top 6 Shootout

Race

References

External links
Official website

Auto races in South Africa
Kyalami
Kyalami